Richard John Hansen (born October 30, 1955 in Northport, New York) is a retired professional ice hockey player who played 14 games in the National Hockey League.  He played for the New York Islanders and St. Louis Blues.

Son Rich Hansen is a star minor professional hockey player for the Rapid City Rush.

External links 

Hansen at Hockeydraftcentral.com

1955 births
Living people
People from Northport, New York
American men's ice hockey centers
New York Islanders draft picks
New York Islanders players
St. Louis Blues players
Ice hockey players from New York (state)